The Bishop of Orkney was the ecclesiastical head of the Diocese of Orkney, one of thirteen medieval bishoprics of Scotland. It included both Orkney and Shetland. It was based for almost all of its history at St Magnus Cathedral, Kirkwall.

The bishopric appears to have been suffragan of the Archbishop of York (with intermittent control exercised by the Archbishop of Hamburg-Bremen) until the creation of the Archbishopric of Trondheim (Niðaros) in 1152. Although Orkney itself did not unite with mainland Scotland until 1468, the Scottish kings and political community had been pushing for control of the islands for centuries. The see, however, remained under the nominal control of Trondheim until the creation of the Archbishopric of St Andrews in 1472, when it became for the first time an officially Scottish bishopric.

The Bishopric's links with Rome ceased to exist after the Scottish Reformation. The bishopric continued, saving temporary abolition between 1638 and 1661, under the episcopal Church of Scotland until the Glorious Revolution of 1688. Episcopacy in the established church in Scotland was permanently abolished in 1689, but a Scottish Episcopal Church bishopric encompassing Orkney was created in 1865, as the Bishopric of Aberdeen and Orkney. In 1878, the Catholic Church in Scotland re-established the bishopric system, and Orkney came under the resurrected and reformatted Diocese of Aberdeen.

Parishes in the medieval period

Orkney 

 Birsay (Mainland)
 Burness (Sanday)
 Burray
 Cross (Sanday)
 Deerness (Mainland)
 Eday
 Egilsay
 Evie (Mainland)
 Firth (Mainland)
 Flotta
 Graemsay
 Harray (Mainland)
 Holm (& Pablay) (Mainland)
 Hoy
 Lady (Sanday)
 Lady (Stronsay)
 North Ronaldsay
 Orphir (Mainland)
 Papa Westray
 Rendall (Mainland)
 Rousay
 Sandwick (Mainland)
 Shapinsay
 St Andrews (Mainland)
 St Mary's (South Ronaldsay)
 St Nicholas (Stronsay)
 St Peter's (South Ronaldsay)
 St Peter's (Stronsay)
 Stenness (Mainland)
 Stromness (Mainland)
 Walls
 Westray

Shetland 

 Aithsting (Mainland)
 Baliasta (Unst)
 Bressay
 Burra
 Cunningsburgh (Mainland)
 Delting (Mainland)
 Dunrossness (Mainland)
 Fair Isle
 Fetlar
 Foula
 Hillswick (Mainland)
 Laxavoe (Mainland)
 Lerwick (Mainland)
 Lund (Unst)
 Lunnasting (Mainland)
 Nesting (Mainland)
 Northmavine (Mainland)
 Northrew (Mainland)
 Norwick (Unst)
 Ollaberry (Mainland)
 Olnafirth (Mainland)
 Papa Stour
 Quarff (Mainland)
 Sandness (Mainland)
 Sandwick (Mainland)
 Tingwall (Mainland)
 Walls (Mainland)
 Weisdale (Mainland)
 Whalsay
 Whiteness (Mainland)
 Yell

List of known bishops of Orkney

References
 Dowden, John, The Bishops of Scotland, ed. J. Maitland Thomson, (Glasgow, 1912)
 Keith, Robert, An Historical Catalogue of the Scottish Bishops: Down to the Year 1688, (third expanded edition: Edinburgh, 1824; reprinted Piscataway, NJ, 2010)
 Watt, D. E. R., Fasti Ecclesiae Scotinanae Medii Aevi ad annum 1638, 2nd draft, (St Andrews, 1969)

   
Orkney  
Kirkwall
1035 establishments in Scotland
1688 disestablishments in Scotland
Roman Catholic dioceses in Scotland